Nicholas Theodore Nemeth (born July 27, 1980) is an American professional wrestler and stand-up comedian. He is currently signed to WWE under the ring name Dolph Ziggler, where he performs on the Raw brand.

After a prolific career in amateur wrestling, where he established several school records for Kent State University, Nemeth signed a developmental contract with WWE in 2004 and was sent to Ohio Valley Wrestling (OVW), where he wrestled under his real name. He was promoted to WWE's Raw brand shortly afterwards in 2005, playing the caddie sidekick to Kerwin White. He was sent back to OVW shortly afterwards, being given the name Nicky and joining the cheerleading-themed Spirit Squad, who debuted on RAW in January 2006 and won the World Tag Team Championship once before returning to OVW that November. In September 2007, Nemeth was assigned to Florida Championship Wrestling (FCW), where he won the FCW Florida Tag Team Championship twice, with Brad Allen and later Gavin Spears.

Upon his return to the main roster in September 2008, Nemeth was repackaged as Dolph Ziggler. Since then, he has held the World Heavyweight Championship twice, the NXT Championship once, the Intercontinental Championship six times, the United States Championship twice, the Raw Tag Team Championship twice, and the SmackDown Tag Team Championship once. Overall in WWE, Nemeth has held 15 total championships, including three world championships.  His other accomplishments include becoming the sole survivor of two Survivor Series elimination matches and the 2012 Money in the Bank winner as well as headlining multiple WWE pay-per-view events.

Early life
Nicholas Theodore Nemeth was born in Cleveland, Ohio, on July 27, 1980. He has been a fan of professional wrestling since he was five years old, when he attended a wrestling event at the Richfield Coliseum, and he decided to become a professional wrestler at age 12. He later revealed on Colt Cabana's Art of Wrestling Podcast that he chose his WWE name "Dolph" because that was his great-grandfather's name, and his friend suggested the surname "Ziggler". Nemeth attended St. Edward High School in Lakewood, Ohio, where he was an amateur wrestler and holds the school record for most pins in a career with 82. At St. Edward, he was teammates with Gray Maynard and Andy Hrovat.

During his time at St. Edward, the wrestling team won the National Championships on two occasions. He was a collegiate wrestler at Kent State University, eventually setting what was then the record for most career wins in the team's history. His record was passed in 2006; as of 2010, he stands second all-time in career victories at Kent State. He had 121 career wins between 2000 and 2003. He majored in political science with a pre-law minor. Prior to his WWE tryout, he had been accepted to the law school at Arizona State University, where he was due to start his first semester. He was a three-time All-Mid-American Conference champion, winning the  tournament in 2000, 2002, and 2003; as of 2010, he is the last wrestler from Kent State University to have won three amateur wrestling championships.

Professional wrestling career

World Wrestling Entertainment / WWE

Early appearances and The Spirit Squad (2004–2006) 

Nemeth signed a contract with World Wrestling Entertainment (WWE) in 2004. He was assigned to their developmental territory Ohio Valley Wrestling (OVW), debuting as "Nick Nemeth". He feuded with Paul Burchill and challenged unsuccessfully for the OVW Television Championship, losing a championship match against then-champion Ken Doane on August 12, 2005.

Nemeth was called up to the Raw roster shortly afterwards, making his television debut on the September 25, 2005, episode of Sunday Night Heat. He was made the enforcer and sidekick for Chavo Guerrero Jr., who was using a golfer in-ring persona and going by the ring name of "Kerwin White". As such, Nemeth became White's caddie. His wrestling debut came on an episode of Sunday Night Heat, teaming up with White in a tag team match against Shelton Benjamin and Matt Striker. After the death of Eddie Guerrero, Chavo Guerrero dropped the "Kerwin White" character, and Nemeth no longer played the role of his caddie and tag partner. After a few months of wrestling in dark matches and at house shows, he was sent back to OVW.

Nemeth became a part of The Spirit Squad faction, a group of five wrestlers who used the in-ring personas of male cheerleaders, and adopted the name Nicky in OVW during late 2005. The Spirit Squad members trained with real cheerleaders and gymnasts to ensure their characters were believable. On January 23, 2006, they had their WWE television debut as a group, appearing on Raw and helping Jonathan Coachman win a Royal Rumble qualifying match against Jerry "The King" Lawler by performing cheers for Coachman and distracting Lawler. They later became a part of the ongoing scripted feud between WWE chairman Vince McMahon and Shawn Michaels. The heel McMahon brought in the Squad to attack Michaels on numerous occasions, including placing them in multiple handicap matches.

They also wrestled in the tag team division, and on April 3, on Raw, won the World Tag Team Championship when Kenny and Mikey, with outside help from the other three Squad members, defeated Big Show and Kane. After winning the championship, all five members of the Spirit Squad were recognized as the champions, allowing any combination of them to defend the championship under the Freebird Rule.

In May, McMahon signed another Handicap match, with the Spirit Squad facing Michaels. The match never started, however; instead the Spirit Squad attacked Michaels, and, as part of the storyline, shattered his knee with a steel chair. McMahon brought Triple H to the ring to attack Michaels with a sledgehammer; however, after Triple H felt that the Squad had disrespected him, he attacked the group. This led to Triple H and Michaels reforming D-Generation X (DX) and they began a feud with the Spirit Squad. DX played various sophomoric jokes on the Squad and the McMahons, as well as defeating the Spirit Squad in handicap tag team matches at Vengeance and a clean sweep in an elimination handicap match at Saturday Night's Main Event XXXIII.

At the same time as their feud with DX and their alignment with McMahon, the Squad also wrestled other teams in Raw's tag division over their World Tag Team Championship, successfully defending the championship against the teams of Jim Duggan and Eugene, Charlie Haas and Viscera, and Snitsky and Val Venis. They then entered a lengthy feud with The Highlanders, whom they eventually defeated to retain the championship at the Unforgiven pay-per-view on September 17. The Squad as a whole later began a losing streak with separate members losing singles matches to Ric Flair on consecutive episodes of Raw, until Kenny managed to defeat him on the October 23 episode. It was then announced that Flair and a WWE legend, selected by interactive voting, would wrestle the team for the World Tag Team Championship at Cyber Sunday. The fans chose Roddy Piper, and he and Flair defeated Kenny and Mikey to win the championship at the event on November 5.

The group disbanded on the November 27 episode of Raw, when they were defeated in a five-on-three handicap match by DX and Flair. In a backstage segment later that night, DX placed all members into a crate stamped "OVW, Louisville, Kentucky", a reference to the developmental territory from which the Squad had come.

Developmental territories (2007–2008) 
Nemeth returned to OVW on January 17, 2007, at the television tapings, again using his Nick Nemeth ring name, along with Mike Mondo, formerly Mikey in the Spirit Squad, as the "Frat Pack". The pair teamed with Mike Kruel in a match against Seth Skyfire, Shawn Spears, and Cody Runnels. The team disbanded in the early parts of 2007. Nemeth then competed in several dark matches before the OVW television tapings, competing against several wrestlers including Chris Cage, Bradley Jay and Jake Hager, before he began teaming with Mondo again in August.

At the end of August, Nemeth and Mike Mondo were moved to the Florida Championship Wrestling (FCW) developmental territory and in his debut there, Nemeth gained the nickname "The Natural" and defeated Hade Vansen. In November 2007, Nemeth gained Big Rob as his manager, but their alliance was short-lived. At the start of 2008, he tweaked his name to "Nic Nemeth" and began teaming with Brad Allen, with the pair gaining Taryn Terrell as their valet. Nemeth and Allen started a frat boy type ring character with Terrell as a sorority girl. On March 22, Nemeth and Allen won the FCW Florida Tag Team Championship by defeating defending champions Eddie Colón and Eric Pérez, but lost the championship to Colón and Pérez on April 15. Throughout April and May 2008, Nemeth wrestled in several dark matches prior to Raw, losing to Kofi Kingston and Ron Killings on several occasions. Soon after, he returned to the name "Nic Nemeth", and began teaming with Gavin Spears. The pair defeated Colón and Pérez to win the FCW Florida Tag Team Championship on August 16, but lost it to Heath Miller and Joe Hennig less than a month later.

Repackaging (2008–2010) 

On September 15, 2008, Nemeth re-debuted on Raw (as a heel), introducing himself in a backstage segment under the name "Dolph Ziggler". On October 10, Nemeth was suspended for 30 days for a violation of WWE's Wellness Program policy. He returned to Raw on November 17 in a backstage segment with Rey Mysterio and Shawn Michaels. In his first match on Raw under the Ziggler name, he lost to Batista on the December 1, 2008 episode. The following week he got his first victory as Ziggler, by countout, against R-Truth. The next week on Raw, he picked up his first televised pinfall victory, when he defeated Charlie Haas. Ziggler would compete in the Royal Rumble match at the eponymous event on January 25, 2009, in which he was eliminated by Kane after 21 seconds.

On April 15, 2009, Ziggler was drafted to the SmackDown brand as part of the 2009 Supplemental Draft. He made his debut on the April 17 episode of SmackDown, defeating United States Champion, Montel Vontavious Porter (MVP) in a non-title match, and, as a result, the following week he demanded a match for the championship. On the May 1 episode of SmackDown, however, he failed to win the championship, after he was pinned by MVP. Ziggler then started a rivalry with The Great Khali, losing to him by disqualification after attacking Khali with a steel chair. As a result, Khali began coming out to the ring during and after Ziggler's matches, in attempt to gain revenge and to stop Ziggler from cheating. Over the next few weeks, Ziggler would defeat Khali by countout and disqualification after making it look like Khali had struck him with a steel chair. At The Bash pay-per-view on June 28, Ziggler defeated Khali in a No Disqualification match by pinfall, after Kane interfered and attacked Khali.

Ziggler then entered an on-screen relationship with WWE Diva Maria and she became his valet. He simultaneously started a scripted rivalry with Intercontinental Champion Rey Mysterio, who defeated Ziggler at Night of Champions on July 26 and SummerSlam on August 23 to retain the championship. In September, Mysterio lost the Intercontinental Championship to John Morrison, and Ziggler entered a feud with Morrison after defeating him by countout in a non-title match, but lost to him at the Hell in a Cell pay-per-view on October 4. On the episode of SmackDown following Hell in a Cell, Ziggler ended his on-screen relationship with Maria after she accidentally cost him a match against Morrison for the Intercontinental Championship. At Breaking Point on September 13, Ziggler made an appearance during a promo by Pat Patterson, in which Ziggler attacked Patterson until Morrison made the save. He again failed to win the Intercontinental title from Morrison twice, wrestling him to a double countout on the November 13 episode of SmackDown and losing a two-out-of-three falls match the following week to end the feud. On the February 26, 2010, episode of SmackDown, Ziggler defeated John Morrison and R-Truth in a triple threat qualifying match to compete in the Money in the Bank ladder match at WrestleMania XXVI on March 28, but was ultimately unsuccessful.

Intercontinental Champion (2010–2011) 

In June 2010, he began a romantic storyline with Vickie Guerrero, who began accompanying him to the ring. On the July 9 episode of SmackDown, Ziggler defeated Chavo Guerrero Jr. and Montel Vontavious Porter in a triple threat match to qualify for the SmackDown Money in the Bank ladder match at the Money in the Bank pay-per-view on July 18, where he once again failed to win the match. On July 28 at the tapings of the August 6 episode of SmackDown Ziggler defeated Kofi Kingston to win the WWE Intercontinental Championship for the first time. In his first title defense at SummerSlam on August 15, he retained the championship against Kingston when the match ended in a no contest due to interference from The Nexus. Ziggler was able to make a successful title defense against Kingston at the Night of Champions pay-per-view on September 19, and against Kaval at Survivor Series on November 21. During this time, Ziggler was chosen as a Pro for the fourth season of NXT, with Jacob Novak as his Rookie. On the January 4, 2011, episode of NXT, Ziggler won a battle royal to earn the right to choose a new rookie, and chose Byron Saxton. His original rookie, Novak, was the first rookie eliminated later that night. On February 8, 2011, Ziggler's second rookie, Byron Saxton, was also voted off of NXT.

Ziggler successfully retained the Intercontinental Championship at TLC: Tables, Ladders and Chairs on December 19 in a three-way ladder match against Kingston and Jack Swagger, but lost the title to Kingston at SmackDown on January 4, 2011, ending his reign at 160 days. That same night, Ziggler won a four-way match against Cody Rhodes, Drew McIntyre and Big Show to become the number one contender to the World Heavyweight Championship. At the Royal Rumble on January 30, Ziggler was unsuccessful in his title match against Edge. On January 28, he teamed up with WWE Champion The Miz in a losing effort against Edge and Randy Orton. On February 4, Ziggler's storyline girlfriend Vickie Guerrero, who was the acting General Manager of SmackDown, banned the spear – Edge's finishing move – and decided that if Edge used it, Ziggler would be awarded the championship. Ziggler was again defeated by Edge in a rematch on the February 11 episode of SmackDown, but because Edge used the spear, Guerrero declared Ziggler the new champion on the February 14 episode of Raw. Prior to Ziggler's official coronation ceremony on SmackDown on February 18, Guerrero also fired Edge, claiming that he had attacked SmackDown General Manager Theodore Long several weeks prior. However, Long interrupted Ziggler's ceremony and accused Guerrero of orchestrating the attack, prompting Guerrero to reveal Ziggler as the attacker and Long to rehire Edge. Long also gave Edge a rematch against Ziggler, who lost the championship back to Edge and was then fired by Long.

On the March 7 episode of Raw, Ziggler was introduced as the newest member of the Raw roster, and defeated John Morrison in a singles match; Ziggler was accompanied by Guerrero, who had also been fired from SmackDown, but she was forced to earn her spot on the Raw roster. Ziggler, along with Guerrero, and LayCool then feuded with Morrison, Trish Stratus, and Jersey Shore guest star Snooki, culminating in a mixed tag team match at WrestleMania XXVII on April 3, which Ziggler and his team lost. On the April 18 episode of Raw, Vickie introduced the "new and improved" Ziggler, who came out with his hair cut short and brown and went on to defeat Evan Bourne in a singles match. Ziggler had re-bleached his hair by the May 23 episode of Raw.

United States Champion (2011–2012) 

Ziggler beat United States Champion Kofi Kingston in a non-title match on the May 30 episode of Raw, leading to a championship match at Capitol Punishment on June 19, which Ziggler won via a sleeper hold submission to earn his first United States Championship. The next night on Raw, Kingston invoked his rematch clause in a two out of three falls match and won via disqualification, allowing Ziggler to retain. After Jack Swagger suggested to Vickie Guerrero that she should manage him in addition to Ziggler, a jealous Ziggler teased tension with Swagger. This, coupled with Ziggler's concurrent feud with Alex Riley, led Ziggler to defend and retain his United States Championship in a fatal four-way match against Swagger, Riley, and John Morrison at Night of Champions on September 18. On the following episode of Raw, Ziggler lost a non-title match to Zack Ryder when guest star Hugh Jackman helped Ryder by punching Ziggler in the face. Although Ziggler later claimed to have a broken jaw due to Jackman's punch, it was reported that the supposed injury was fake. Later that night, Guerrero officially began managing Swagger, and Swagger began interfering in Ziggler's matches to help him win. Ziggler and Swagger unsuccessfully challenged Air Boom for the WWE Tag Team Championship at Hell in a Cell on October 2 and at Vengeance on October 23, where Ziggler also successfully defended the United States Championship against Ryder. He went on to successfully defend the championship against Morrison at Survivor Series on November 20. At TLC: Tables, Ladders and Chairs on December 18, Ziggler lost the United States Championship to Ryder, ending his reign at 182 days.

On the December 26 episode of Raw, Ziggler defeated WWE Champion CM Punk in a gauntlet match for a championship opportunity following interference from John Laurinaitis. The following Raw, Ziggler defeated Punk by countout after Laurinaitis interfered again; as a result, Ziggler did not win the championship. At the Royal Rumble on January 29, 2012, Ziggler failed to capture the WWE Championship from CM Punk. At the Elimination Chamber on February 19, Ziggler failed again to capture the WWE Championship after being eliminated second by Chris Jericho. Nemeth noted to Arda Ocal in an interview for The Score Television Network that the Elimination Chamber left him with multiple minor injuries and it is a match he least looked forward to working.

On the February 27 Raw, Ziggler and Swagger unsuccessfully challenged Primo & Epico for the WWE Tag Team Championship in a Triple Threat tag team match, also involving Kofi Kingston and R-Truth. On the March 19 Raw, Ziggler and Swagger were announced as the newest members of Team Johnny for the 12-man tag team match at WrestleMania XXVIII and on the April 2 Raw, Ziggler and Swagger unsuccessfully challenged Santino Marella for the United States Championship in a triple threat match. After the match, Ziggler began a feud with Brodus Clay, who attacked Ziggler with a headbutt after he and Swagger tried to attack Marella. On the following episode of Raw, Ziggler and Swagger were defeated by Clay and Marella in a tag team match. In the following weeks, Ziggler and Swagger lost to Clay and Hornswoggle in singles and tag matches. At Extreme Rules on April 29, Ziggler was again defeated by Clay. Ziggler and Swagger unsuccessfully challenged Kofi Kingston and R-Truth for WWE Tag Team Championship, first at Over the Limit on May 20 and second on the May 28 episode of Raw, resulting in Ziggler showing signs of wanting to break away from Guerrero and Swagger.

On the June 11 episode of Raw, Ziggler defeated The Great Khali, Swagger and Christian in a fatal four-way elimination match to become the number one contender to the World Heavyweight Championship, but at No Way Out on June 17, Ziggler lost the title match to champion Sheamus. On the following Raw, Guerrero, finally tired of the bickering between Ziggler and Swagger, arranged for a match between them; Ziggler won the match and Guerrero's affections, ending their partnership. Ziggler received another shot at the World title on the June 29 SmackDown, but was again defeated by Sheamus in a triple threat match, also involving Alberto Del Rio.

World Heavyweight Champion (2012–2013) 

On the July 3 SmackDown, Ziggler defeated Alex Riley to qualify for a spot in the World Heavyweight Championship Money in the Bank ladder match. On July 13, Ziggler, Zack Ryder and Justin Roberts were involved in a car accident in San Diego while driving from Comic-Con; none of them suffered severe injuries. Two days later at the Money in the Bank pay-per-view, Ziggler won the Money in the Bank ladder match to guarantee him the opportunity to challenge for the World Heavyweight Championship at a time of his choosing within the next year. Later that night, Ziggler attempted to cash in the briefcase on Sheamus after Alberto Del Rio attacked him after their match, but Del Rio stopped Ziggler from cashing in. On the following episode of SmackDown, Ziggler again attempted to cash in the briefcase on Sheamus following a tag team match with Del Rio, but was laid out by Rey Mysterio and Sheamus before he could do so. During this time, Ziggler began a feud with Chris Jericho after claiming he had lost his touch, which resulted in Jericho attacking him on two occasions, and defeating him in a singles match at SummerSlam on August 19. The night after SummerSlam, Ziggler defeated Jericho in a rematch; as a result Ziggler retained his Money in the Bank contract and Jericho's WWE contract was terminated. Following this, Ziggler began feuding with Randy Orton on SmackDown four days later, after Orton hit him with an RKO when Ziggler tried to cash his Money in the Bank contract on a vulnerable Sheamus. The following week on SmackDown, Ziggler faced Orton in a match that was won by Orton, Ziggler defeated him in a rematch on Raw by pinning him while holding his tights. Ziggler faced Orton again at Night of Champions on September 16 where he lost again, ending the feud. On November 18 at Survivor Series, Ziggler captained the traditional 5-on-5 elimination tag team match opposite Mick Foley and won the match by last pinning Orton, making him the sole survivor of the match.

Ziggler then began feuding with John Cena after he sided with Vickie Guerrero to help defame Cena and AJ Lee by alleging they had a romantic relationship. On December 16 at TLC: Tables, Ladders and Chairs, Ziggler retained his Money in the Bank briefcase in a ladder match after AJ interfered and turned on Cena. The following night on Raw, while trying to diffuse an argument between Vickie and AJ, AJ unexpectedly kissed Ziggler, leaving him confused. Ziggler then attempted to cash in his Money in the Bank briefcase on Big Show after Show was assaulted by Sheamus, but he was attacked by Cena before the match could start. Later, Ziggler teamed with AJ to face Cena and Vickie Guerrero, however, the match ended in a disqualification after the debuting Big E Langston attacked Cena, also starting an on-screen relationship between Dolph and AJ. Ziggler ended 2012 having wrestled the second most TV/PPV matches that year with 90; however, he had the most TV/PPV losses with 57. Ziggler ended his feud with Cena after losing to him on the January 7, 2013, episode of Raw, in a singles match and in steel cage match the following week, despite outside interference from AJ and Langston in both matches. On the January 21 episode of Raw, Ziggler won a Beat the Clock Challenge to earn the right to choose what number he can enter in the Royal Rumble match, first or second. Six days later at the Royal Rumble, Ziggler entered at number one, eliminating Chris Jericho and The Godfather and lasted nearly fifty minutes before being eliminated by Sheamus. During the match, Ziggler resumed his feud with the returning Jericho. The following night on Raw, Ziggler and Jericho were placed in a "Strange Bedfellows" match against WWE Tag Team Champions Team Hell No (Daniel Bryan and Kane), but they lost when Kane hit a chokeslam on Ziggler and pinned him after Jericho framed him for pushing Kane. On the February 18 episode of Raw, Ziggler was defeated by World Heavyweight Champion Alberto Del Rio by submission in a non-title match, and afterwards Langston attacked Del Rio and then Ziggler made a failed attempt to cash in his Money in the Bank briefcase after Del Rio's ring announcer Ricardo Rodriguez ran off with it. After defeating WWE Tag Team Champions Daniel Bryan and Kane in singles matches due to interference from Langston, Ziggler and Langston were given a shot at their titles. The title match took place on April 7 at WrestleMania 29, where Ziggler and Langston unsuccessfully challenged Bryan and Kane for the WWE Tag Team Championship.

The following night on Raw, Ziggler cashed in his Money in the Bank contract on an injured Alberto Del Rio to win his second World Heavyweight Championship. After gaining the World Heavyweight Championship, Ziggler began feuding with Del Rio and Jack Swagger over the title. Ziggler was originally booked to face Del Rio and Swagger in a three-way ladder match at Extreme Rules on May 19; however, Ziggler suffered a legitimate concussion at a SmackDown taping, thus removing their match from the pay-per-view and resulting in Ziggler being absent from television for a month. On June 16 at Payback, Ziggler faced Del Rio in his first title defense of the World Heavyweight Championship and during the match, a double turn took place; Ziggler turned face by displaying a never-say-die attitude while Del Rio turned heel by repeatedly and ruthlessly targeting his head to take advantage of his concussion, win the match, and end Ziggler's reign at 69 days. On July 14 at Money in the Bank, AJ cost Ziggler his title rematch against Alberto Del Rio, after she prematurely snuck into the ring and hit Del Rio with her own title, prompting a disqualification.

On the following Raw, Ziggler ended his relationship with AJ due to her actions the previous night and AJ exacted revenge by costing Ziggler a non-title match against Del Rio, then she attacked Ziggler and unleashed Langston on him. On the July 29, 2013, episode of Raw, Ziggler defeated Big E Langston via disqualification after AJ Lee attacked Ziggler. In a rematch on the following week, Ziggler was defeated by Langston after a distraction by AJ and Kaitlyn. This led to the host of SummerSlam, The Miz creating a mixed tag team match at SummerSlam on August 18, where Ziggler and Kaitlyn defeated Big E and AJ.

Feud with The Authority (2013–2015)

Ziggler was later unsuccessful in capturing the United States Championship, when he lost to Dean Ambrose at Night of Champions on September 15 and on the October 16 episode of Main Event, ending their feud. After that rivalry was over, Ziggler lost several matches during the late-2013 calendar year when he also failed to win the Intercontinental Championship from Curtis Axel on the November 11 episode of Raw. In December, Ziggler lost two number one contender matches for the Intercontinental Championship, first to Damien Sandow and later to Fandango.

At the Royal Rumble on January 26, 2014, Ziggler entered the Royal Rumble match, but was eliminated by Roman Reigns. On April 6 at WrestleMania XXX, Ziggler competed in the 31-man Andre the Giant Memorial Battle Royal, but was eliminated by Alberto Del Rio. On June 29 at Money in the Bank, Ziggler competed in the Money in the Bank ladder match for a WWE World Heavyweight Championship contract, but the match was won by Seth Rollins. Ziggler later competed in a Battle Royal for the vacant Intercontinental Championship on July 20 at Battleground; however, he was abruptly eliminated from behind by The Miz. After Ziggler defeated Miz in a non-title match the following night on Raw, he received a rematch at SummerSlam on August 17, where he defeated Miz to win the championship for a second time. The next night on Raw, Ziggler successfully retained his title against Miz, after he was counted out. At Night of Champions on September 21, Ziggler dropped the title to Miz, only for Ziggler to win it back the following night on Raw. Ziggler then retained the championship against Cesaro on September 26 episode of SmackDown, in a triple threat match against Cesaro and Miz the next week on Raw and at Hell in a Cell on October 26 against Cesaro in a 2-out-of-3 falls match.

On the October 28, 2014, episode of Raw, Ziggler and John Cena shook hands together backstage, which The Authority interpreted as a deal to plot against them. As a result, Ziggler was put in a match against Kane, which Ziggler won. Ziggler then joined Team Cena at Survivor Series. On the November 10 episode of Raw, Ziggler was brutally attacked by the returning Luke Harper. The following week, Harper was awarded a title match against Ziggler, which Harper won with assistance from The Authority, ending Ziggler's reign at 56 days. At Survivor Series on November 23, Ziggler emerged as the sole survivor for a second time. Ziggler contributed to Rusev being counted out, then after all his teammates were eliminated, he pinned Kane and Luke Harper. Triple H twice prevented Ziggler from pinning final opponent Seth Rollins, but the debuting Sting provided an assist to help Ziggler win the match, thus ousting the Authority from power. At TLC on December 14, Ziggler defeated Harper in a ladder match to win his fourth Intercontinental Championship. On the December 16 episode of SmackDown, Ziggler finally defeated Seth Rollins in a singles match after failing numerous times before. Three days later, Rolling Stone named Ziggler as the 2014 WWE Wrestler of the Year. On the first Raw of 2015 (dated January 5), the recently reinstated Authority forced Ziggler to defend his Intercontinental Championship against Bad News Barrett and he initially won. After Barrett then attacked and injured Ziggler's shoulder, Kane declared the match as two-out-of-three falls, Barrett proceeded to defeat Ziggler for the title after Kane distracted him. Later that night, Ziggler alongside Ryback and Erick Rowan were fired by the Authority.

On the January 19 episode of Raw, Sting provided another assist, as John Cena won Ziggler, Ryback and Rowan's jobs back. Ziggler returned to television on the next SmackDown and qualified for the Royal Rumble match by beating Barrett in a non-title match. In the Royal Rumble match on January 25, Ziggler entered as the last entrant, eliminating Bad News Barrett and Cesaro but was quickly eliminated by Big Show and Kane. At Fastlane on February 22, Ziggler competed together with Rowan and Ryback in a six-man tag team match against Rollins, Big Show and Kane, which they lost. On the March 5 episode of SmackDown, Ziggler was announced as a participant in the 7-man ladder match for the Intercontinental Championship at WrestleMania 31 on March 29, which was won by Daniel Bryan.

Storyline with Lana and Rusev (2015–2016)
After losing an Intercontinental Championship match against Daniel Bryan on the Raw following WrestleMania 31, Ziggler was attacked and Brogue kicked by the returning Sheamus. Claiming that "the era of underdogs (like Ziggler) is over", Sheamus and Ziggler started a feud, with Sheamus challenging Ziggler in a Kiss Me Arse match at Extreme Rules on April 26, which Ziggler won. However, Sheamus refused to follow the stipulation, and instead made Ziggler kiss his buttocks. Ziggler lost the rematch against Sheamus at Payback on May 17. Ziggler participated in the Elimination Chamber match for the vacated Intercontinental Championship; other participants were winner Ryback, King Barrett, R-Truth, Sheamus who eliminated Ziggler, and Mark Henry at Elimination Chamber on May 31. At Money in the Bank on June 14, Ziggler competed in the Money in the Bank ladder match, which was won by Sheamus. On July 4 at The Beast in the East live event in Japan, Ziggler and John Cena defeated King Barrett and Kane in the main event.

Ziggler became involved in an on-screen love affair with Lana, the former manager of Rusev, when she kissed him at Raw on May 25, with Lana serving as Ziggler's valet during his matches. During this time, Ziggler started incorporating elements of 80's glam rock fashion into his entrance and ring attire; typical of 80's bands like Mötley Crüe and Poison. In June, after Ziggler and Lana confirmed their storyline relationship, Summer Rae allied with Rusev to even the odds. After an attack by Rusev, Ziggler suffered a bruised trachea in storyline, which was to give him some time off to film a new WWE Studios movie, titled 6:42. Ziggler returned on the August 17 episode of Raw, aiding Lana during a confrontation against Rusev and Summer Rae. This altercation prompted a match between Ziggler and Rusev at SummerSlam on August 23, which ended in a double countout due to interference from Lana and Rae. In a rematch on September 20 at Night of Champions, Ziggler emerged victorious. On October 11, when TMZ reported the real–life engagement of Rusev and Lana, this officially ended their feud. The following night on Raw, Ziggler unsuccessfully challenged John Cena for the United States Championship.

On the October 22 episode of SmackDown, Ziggler started a feud with the debuting Tyler Breeze, who aligned with Summer Rae and attacked Ziggler. Ziggler entered a tournament for the vacant WWE World Heavyweight Championship, defeating The Miz in the first round match before being eliminated by Dean Ambrose. Ziggler and Breeze continued their feud, which culminated in a match between the two at Survivor Series on November 22, which Ziggler lost. Ziggler would then enter a feud with Kevin Owens with the pair trading victories throughout the rest of December and beginning of 2016. Ziggler entered the Royal Rumble on January 24 as the 28th entrant, lasting 7 minutes, but was eliminated by the eventual winner, Triple H. The next night on Raw, Ziggler faced Kevin Owens in a losing effort, but defeated him the following two weeks in a row. On the February 15 Raw, Ziggler was involved in a fatal five-way match for the Intercontinental Championship, where Owens regained the title after pinning Tyler Breeze. At Fastlane on February 21, Ziggler challenged Owens to a match for the Intercontinental Championship, which he lost. In the following weeks, Ziggler began to re-ignite his feud with The Authority, and on the March 14 episode of Raw, he confronted Triple H and Stephanie McMahon. This resulted in Ziggler being granted a match against Triple H where if he won, he could pick his match at WrestleMania (excluding the WWE World Heavyweight Championship match); however, Ziggler lost. At WrestleMania 32 on April 3, Ziggler competed against Kevin Owens, Sami Zayn, The Miz, Stardust, Sin Cara and Zack Ryder in a ladder match for the Intercontinental Championship, which Ryder won.

After WrestleMania 32, Ziggler went to a double countout with Baron Corbin on the April 4 episode of Raw, leading to Corbin hitting an End of Days outside of the ring to Ziggler, igniting a feud in the process. At the Payback pre-show on May 1, Ziggler faced Baron Corbin in a winning effort. The two then had a no disqualification match at Extreme Rules on May 22 where Corbin won after hitting a low blow on Ziggler. Following Extreme Rules, on the May 23 episode of Raw, Ziggler had a confrontation backstage with Corbin and challenged him to a technical wrestling match the next week. In that match, Ziggler intentionally got himself disqualified when he kicked Corbin in the groin immediately after the match began. This led to a rubber match at Money in the Bank on June 19, which Corbin won to end their feud.

Championship reigns (2016–2018)
On July 19 at the 2016 WWE draft, Ziggler was drafted to SmackDown. On the July 26 episode of SmackDown, Ziggler won a six-pack challenge against AJ Styles, Apollo Crews, Baron Corbin, Bray Wyatt, and John Cena to become the number one contender for the WWE World Championship. On the August 2 edition of SmackDown, Ziggler defended his contendership against Bray Wyatt. Ziggler won the match, but was attacked afterwards by Wyatt and Erick Rowan, who also laid out Dean Ambrose when he attempted to save Ziggler. On August 21 at SummerSlam, Ziggler was defeated by Ambrose. Next, Ziggler started a feud over The Miz's Intercontinental Championship, failing to capture the title at Backlash on September 11 after Maryse sprayed something at Ziggler whilst Miz distracted the referee. After failing to win the Intercontinental title in the following weeks, Ziggler would defeat The Miz at No Mercy on October 9 to win the title in a match where he would have to retire if he lost. However, he lost the title 37 days later against The Miz on the 900th episode of SmackDown. The feud culminated in a Ladder match at the TLC: Tables, Ladders, & Chairs even on December 4 for the championship in what was advertised as their final match, where Ziggler was defeated.

On the December 13 edition of SmackDown, Ziggler pinned Dean Ambrose in a fatal four-way elimination match also involving The Miz and Luke Harper, to become the number one contender to AJ Styles' WWE Championship. The following week, Baron Corbin confronted Ziggler, and the two had a match with Ziggler's number one contender's spot on the line. The match ended in a double count-out and Daniel Bryan made the December 27 episode's WWE Championship match a triple-threat between Styles, Ziggler, and Corbin. In that match, Styles retained the WWE Championship after pinning Ziggler.

On the January 3, 2017, episode of SmackDown, after he lost to Baron Corbin, Kalisto came to the save of Ziggler during a post match assault by Corbin, he superkicked Kalisto, turning heel for the first time since 2013. At Elimination Chamber on February 12, Ziggler lost to Apollo Crews and Kalisto in two-on-one handicap match. Following the match, Ziggler attacked the victors, stomping on Crews' ankle after placing it in a chair. This led to a chairs match on the February 28 SmackDown, where Ziggler was victorious. On April 2 on the WrestleMania 33 kickoff show, Ziggler was part of the André the Giant Memorial Battle Royal, managing to eliminate R-Truth, Rhyno and Tian Bing, from which he was eliminated by the eventual winner Mojo Rawley. He lost to Shinsuke Nakamura at Backlash on May 21.

After some time away from TV, Ziggler returned on the August 22 edition of SmackDown Live to declare that he would undergo a gimmick change on the following week's edition. He later started mocking, week after week, the entrances of current and former wrestlers such as John Cena, Naomi, Shawn Michaels and Randy Savage. Ziggler believed that fans only cared about elaborated entrances, and not about the in-ring performances, where he claimed he was the best. This led to a feud with Bobby Roode, being defeated by him at Hell in a Cell on October 8, but at Clash of Champions on December 17, he defeated Baron Corbin and Roode in a triple threat match to win his second United States Championship. On the following episode of SmackDown on December 19, Ziggler held a celebration that was a retrospective of his WWE career; he said that the fans did not deserve him and placed the title belt in the ring before leaving. A week later, general manager Daniel Bryan vacated the title.

Ziggler returned at the Royal Rumble on January 28, 2018, as the surprise #30 entrant in the men's Royal Rumble match. After eliminating Goldust, however, Ziggler was eliminated by Finn Bálor. He would be involved at Fastlane on March 11 in a six pack challenge for the WWE Championship, where the champion AJ Styles retained. Next month, Ziggler took part in the André the Giant Memorial Battle Royal at WrestleMania 34 on April 8, but did not win the trophy.

Alliance with Drew McIntyre (2018–2019)

On April 16, Ziggler was moved to Raw as part of the Superstar Shake-up, and that night, he allied himself with the returning Drew McIntyre to attack Titus Worldwide (Titus O'Neil and Apollo Crews), whom they defeated the following week. On the June 18 episode of Raw, Ziggler answered Seth Rollins' open challenge for the Intercontinental Championship and defeated Rollins to capture the title for a sixth time. After weeks of McIntyre assisting Ziggler in all situations, including Extreme Rules on July 15 where Ziggler defeated Rollins 5–4 in sudden death overtime of a 30-Minute Iron Man match, Dean Ambrose returned on the August 13 episode of Raw to even the odds for Rollins. At SummerSlam on August 19, Ziggler lost the championship to Rollins, who had Ambrose in his corner.

On the September 3 episode of Raw, Ziggler and McIntyre temporarily formed a stable with Braun Strowman known as "The Dogs of War" to combat the newly reunited The Shield (Roman Reigns, Seth Rollins and Dean Ambrose). Later that night, they won the Raw Tag Team Championship by defeating The B-Team (Bo Dallas and Curtis Axel). They then successfully defended their titles at Hell in a Cell on September 16 against Rollins and Ambrose. At the Super Show-Down event on October 6, Ziggler teamed with McIntyre and Strowman in a losing effort to The Shield in a six-man tag team match. Over the next two weeks, the respective groups faced each other again on Raw, with The Dogs of War winning the first match, but losing the latter after Ziggler got pinned by Ambrose. During both matches, tensions arose between Ziggler, McIntyre and Strowman, who felt he was carrying the group. After losing the last match, Strowman turned on Ziggler and attacked him, before being attacked by McIntyre.

Ziggler and McIntyre lost the Raw Tag Team Championship to Rollins and Ambrose on the October 22 episode of Raw after interference from Braun Strowman. On the December 3 episode of Raw, the alliance between Ziggler and McIntyre ended when McIntyre claimed that Ziggler was "a means to an end to get him into a prominent position" and ended their association. The two later faced each other in a match which Ziggler won after interference from Finn Bálor. After the three men had traded wins among each other and interfered in each other's matches over the next few weeks, McIntyre defeated Ziggler in a cage match on the December 31 episode of Raw.

After this, Ziggler was off television until his appearance at the Royal Rumble match at the titular event on January 27, 2019, as participant number 28, eliminating McIntyre and lasting until the final three, before being eliminated by Braun Strowman. He would then disappear again from WWE television without notice due to a stand-up comedy tour that started following the Royal Rumble.

The Dirty Dawgs (2019–2022) 

After a four-month hiatus, Ziggler returned on the May 21 episode of SmackDown Live, attacking WWE Champion Kofi Kingston. Ziggler failed to win the title from Kingston at Super ShowDown on June 7 and Stomping Grounds on June 23 in a steel cage match, ending their long-time feud. At Extreme Rules on July 14, he lost to Kevin Owens in only 17 seconds and failed to win the WWE Championship from Kingston in a triple threat match also including Samoa Joe at Smackville on July 27. On the July 23 episode of SmackDown Live, Ziggler interrupted Miz TV featuring Shawn Michaels and attacked Michaels and The Miz. This led to a match against Goldberg at SummerSlam on August 11, being defeated in a short match.

On the August 26 episode of Raw, Ziggler teamed with Robert Roode to win a tag-team turmoil match, earning a Raw Tag Team Championship match at Clash of Champions. At the event on September 15, Ziggler and Roode won the titles from Seth Rollins and Braun Strowman. On the October 14 episode of Raw, Ziggler and Roode lost the titles to The Viking Raiders (Erik and Ivar), ending their reign at 29 days. and they were drafted to the SmackDown brand as part of the 2019 WWE Draft. At Survivor Series on November 24, Ziggler and Roode won a 10-team Interbrand Tag Team Battle Royal. In the following weeks, they aligned themselves with King Corbin during his feud against Roman Reigns. On January 26, 2020, at the Royal Rumble, Ziggler entered the Royal Rumble match at number 19, but was eliminated by Reigns. At Super ShowDown on February 27, Ziggler lost to Mansoor. At Elimination Chamber on March 8, Ziggler and Roode competed in the namesake match for the SmackDown Tag Team Championship, where the champions The Miz and John Morrison retained. In March, due to the outbreak of the COVID-19 pandemic, Roode was forced to stay in his native Canada, putting the team on hiatus.

At the same time, Ziggler entered a feud with Otis over the affections of Mandy Rose, using underhanded tactics to secure a Valentine's Day date and short-term relationship, but was soon exposed. On the second night of WrestleMania 36 on April 5, Ziggler lost to Otis. After a few more assaults and promos, the feud ended when Otis defeated Ziggler in a Money in the Bank qualifying match. On the June 22 episode of Raw,  it was announced that Ziggler and Roode were traded to the Raw brand for A.J. Styles. On that night, Ziggler issued a challenge to WWE Champion Drew McIntyre, which McIntyre accepted for The Horror Show at Extreme Rules. At the event on July 19, Ziggler failed to win the title.

As part of the 2020 Draft in October, both Ziggler and Roode were drafted back to the SmackDown brand. On the January 8, 2021 episode of SmackDown, Ziggler and Roode defeated The Street Profits (Angelo Dawkins and Montez Ford) to win the SmackDown Tag Team Championship; with this win, Ziggler became the sixth wrestler (along with Kofi Kingston, The Miz, Jeff Hardy, Matt Hardy and John Morrison) to hold the original World Tag Team, Raw Tag Team and SmackDown Tag Team Championships. At the Royal Rumble on January 31, 2021, Ziggler entered the Royal Rumble match at No. 6, eliminating Jeff Hardy but was eliminated by Kane. At WrestleMania SmackDown on April 9, Roode and Ziggler defeated Alpha Academy (Chad Gable and Otis), Rey & Dominik Mysterio and The Street Profits in a fatal four-way match to retain the titles. On the April 16 episode of SmackDown, Ziggler and Roode retained the titles against The Street Profits. At WrestleMania Backlash on May 16, Ziggler and Roode lost the titles to Rey and Dominik Mysterio ending their reign at 128 days. They were drafted to the Raw brand in the 2021 Draft. On the October 25 episode of Raw, Ziggler and Roode defeated The Street Profits and Alpha Academy (Chad Gable and Otis) in a #1 contender's match for the Raw Tag Team Championship, facing the champions, RK-Bro (Randy Orton and Riddle) for the titles later that night in a losing effort. At Survivor Series on November 21, Ziggler participated in a 25-man dual-branded battle royal to commemorate the 25th anniversary of The Rock's debut at the 1996 Survivor Series, eliminating Mansoor before he was eliminated by AJ Styles. Ziggler competed in the Royal Rumble on January 29, 2022, entering at No. 16 but was eliminated by Bad Bunny and Rey Mysterio.

On the February 8 episode of NXT 2.0, Ziggler made a surprise appearance during a segment with Bron Breakker and Santos Escobar. At NXT Roadblock on March 8, Ziggler defeated Tommaso Ciampa and defending champion Breakker in a triple threat match to win the NXT Championship, capturing his first world championship in nearly nine years, while becoming the first NXT Champion to not be a part of NXT. The following week, he successfully defended his title against L. A. Knight. At Stand & Deliver on April 2, he retained the title against Breakker due to interference from Roode. However, on the April 4 episode of Raw, Ziggler lost his title to Breakker, ending his reign at 27 days.

Return to singles competition (2022–present) 
On the June 27 episode of Raw, Ziggler competed in a Money in the Bank qualifying battle royal, which was won by Riddle. On the July 11 episode of Raw, Ziggler helped Bobby Lashley and Riddle against Seth "Freakin" Rollins and Theory's underhanded tactics during a tag team match, and after the match, Ziggler superkicked Theory, turning face for the first time since 2017. After weeks of Ziggler interrupting Theory's matches, on the August 15 episode of Raw, Theory defeated Ziggler, ending their feud.

Professional wrestling style and persona

Sports Illustrated described Ziggler as "phenomenal in the ring, with the ability to carry an entertaining match with practically anyone on the WWE roster" and added that his "mic work is top-notch... and there is a genuine believability in his work". He is also noted for his "elite" ability to sell for his opponents. Jim Cornette praised Ziggler and stated, "I knew he was a good athlete, [but] I never dreamed he was going to be the second coming of Curt Hennig."

Ziggler's most commonly utilized finishing maneuvers are a jumping reverse bulldog, known as the Zig Zag, as well as a superkick. In the early run of his Ziggler character, he also used a sleeper hold as a submission finisher. While still in developmental, he also utilized a jumping reverse STO named Blonde Ambition. Due to his athleticism and intense showmanship, Ziggler has been referred to as "The Showstealer" and "The Showoff", while in his earlier career he was referred to as "The Natural". Upon teaming with Vickie Guerrero, he was nicknamed either "Blonde Ambition" or "Blonde Perfection". Consequently, his theme music was named "I Am Perfection" during this period of his career, while later on it was changed to "Here to Show the World."

In the early stages of his career, Ziggler was introduced to the audiences as a sidekick with a caddie gimmick. This, however, lasted only a few weeks because Chavo Guerrero aborted his golfer gimmick after the death of his uncle Eddie Guerrero. While there were initial plannings within the company to give him a new gimmick based on his successful career in amateur wrestling and pair him with Kurt Angle, this idea never surfaced. Instead, his first longer lasting gimmick became that of male cheerleader Nicky, where he was partnered with four other wrestlers as The Spirit Squad. To ensure their characters were believable, they trained with real cheerleaders and gymnasts. With this gimmick, he saw moderate success, winning the World Tag Team Championship once. After the disbanding of the Spirit Squad he was again sent back to developmental, where he and fellow Spirit Squad member Mike Mondo tweaked the gimmick into a jock and fraternity based new gimmick, now going by the name of "Frat Pack". He would continue this gimmick alongside Brad Allen and Gavin Spears, with whom he won the FCW Florida Tag Team Championship once each. In a 2020 interview, Ziggler voiced amusement as well as creative frustration towards his early gimmicks, stating that he tried to make them work, knowing they could only fail, just to break through in professional wrestling.

By 2008, Nemeth was repackaged as Dolph Ziggler, a bleached-blonde and self-absorbed narcissist. Debuting as a heel, Ziggler repeatedly declared himself as "perfection" and would display an extremely arrogant attitude, while at the same time using dirty tactics. When he turned face in 2013, his character shifted towards a man out to prove himself and never giving up. In September 2017, Ziggler would begin a new short-lived gimmick where he would come out to the entrance themes and dress as other popular wrestlers and legends to irritate the crowd. After that, his gimmick tweaked towards a whiny heel who believed he was destined for greatness, constantly blaming his bad luck or others for his lack of opportunity and would always come up short, culminating in his feud with Kofi Kingston in 2019, where he would blame Kingston (and later Drew McIntyre) for stealing his chance to become WWE champion while stating "it should've been me".

Stand-up comedy
Nemeth grew up as a fan of comedians such as Johnny Carson, Dana Carvey, Phil Hartman, Jan Hooks, Jon Lovitz, Brian Regan, Adam Sandler, and George Wallace. He decided to start performing comedy around the year 2010. He performed stand-up comedy for the first time in a small Los Angeles venue in 2013, and began getting offers to perform at various comedy clubs nearby WWE events. At this point, he had been studying comedy almost a decade in preparation for a comedy career. He also began hosting a monthly improv comedy show called Flying Chuck alongside fellow professional wrestlers John Morrison and his brother Ryan Nemeth. A few years later, he started working as an opening act for his long-time friend Sarah Tiana. In July 2018, he appeared on Comedy Central's Roast Battle III to face off against Tiana.

In 2018, Nemeth started seriously moonlighting as a stand-up comedian while still wrestling for WWE. This led to him headlining shows close to the arenas for the 2018 SummerSlam and Survivor Series pay-per-views; he used the big WWE events to piggyback on for his first major shows, due to there being a lot of wrestling fans in the area. Following the 2019 Royal Rumble event, he embarked on his first headlining tour from the end of January to the end of March. He took a break from WWE television to focus on the tour. He later continued the tour, announcing two shows in Texas taking place in late May.

In other media
Ziggler appeared on the November 3, 2009 episode of Deal or No Deal with Maria Kanellis and Eve Torres. He appeared on Lopez Tonight on August 9, 2010. Nemeth appeared in a 2011 episode of Silent Library alongside Chris Masters, Trent Baretta, JTG, Caylen Croft, and Curt Hawkins. Nemeth made regular appearances on fellow WWE wrestler Zack Ryder's YouTube web series, Z! True Long Island Story, via his own segment named 'Ask Z Heel'.

On February 1, 2012, Nemeth debuted WWEFanNation's WWE Download and was the host of the YouTube series. The official WWE Download playlist on YouTube described the series as "Dolph Ziggler's sarcastic wit vs. your videos" and each episode consisted of Ziggler reviewing both viral and WWE videos. A new episode of WWE Download was uploaded every Monday until the show ended on January 28, 2013, after 53 episodes but returned for one time only on September 30, 2014. In August 2013, Nemeth was cast by Max Landis to appear in the 2015 film Me Him Her.

In 2016, Nemeth would appear in a series of ads advertising KFC. and 2017 In the ads, he dressed as KFC founder Colonel Sanders. The first ad notably had Nemeth cutting a promo on The Miz, who was dressed as a chicken. This led to a dark match where Nemeth, as Colonel Sanders, defeated Miz in a squash match.

Nemeth began appearing on the Fox Business Network program Kennedy hosted by Lisa Kennedy Montgomery in 2017. As of 2018, he has appeared on the show 6-8 times.

Ziggler is a playable character in the video games WWE SmackDown vs Raw 2010, WWE SmackDown vs Raw 2011, WWE '12, WWE '13, WWE 2K14, WWE 2K15, WWE 2K16, WWE 2K17, WWE 2K18, WWE 2K19, WWE 2K20, and WWE 2K22.

Personal life
Nemeth resides in Phoenix, Arizona. He is an avid fan of the Cleveland Browns.

Nemeth has two brothers. His younger brother Ryan is also a professional wrestler, currently signed to AEW, who previously worked with WWE in NXT under the ring name Briley Pierce. His other brother, Donald, was sentenced to 15 years in prison after pleading guilty to involuntary manslaughter, kidnapping, and robbery for his role in a botched robbery attempt that led to the murder of a former Marine in January 2016.

Nemeth is good friends with his former Spirit Squad teammates, particularly Michael Brendli, with whom he lived in Florida until 2008. He previously dated comedian Amy Schumer, who split up with him because she considered him "too athletic" in bed.

Nemeth is fluent in American Sign Language.

Filmography

Championships and accomplishments

 Pro Wrestling Illustrated
 Ranked No. 9 of the top 500 singles wrestlers in the PWI 500 in 2013
 Rolling Stone
 Wrestler of the Year (2014)
 Worst Storyline (2015) - with Rusev, Summer Rae and Lana
 WrestleCrap
 Gooker Award (2015) - feud with Rusev, Summer Rae and Lana
 Wrestling Observer Newsletter
 Most Improved (2011)
 Most Underrated (2011)
 Florida Championship Wrestling
 FCW Florida Tag Team Championship (2 times) – with Brad Allen (1) and Gavin Spears (1)
 World Wrestling Entertainment (WWE)
 NXT Championship (1 time)
 World Heavyweight Championship (2 times)
 WWE United States Championship (2 times)
 WWE Intercontinental Championship (6 times)
 WWE SmackDown Tag Team Championship (1 time) – with Robert Roode
 WWE Raw Tag Team Championship (2 times) – with Drew McIntyre (1) and Robert Roode (1)
 World Tag Team Championship (1 time) – with Johnny, Kenny, Mikey, and Mitch
 Money in the Bank (2012 – World Heavyweight Championship contract)
 22nd Triple Crown Champion
 Slammy Award (2 times)
 Best Twitter Handle or Social Champion (2014) – @HEELZiggler
 Match of the Year (2014) –

Notes

References

External links

 
 
 
 

1980 births
American male comedians
American male professional wrestlers
American male sport wrestlers
American people of Hungarian descent
Kent State Golden Flashes wrestlers
Kent State University alumni
Living people
Male actors from Cleveland
NWA/WCW/WWE United States Heavyweight Champions
NXT Champions
Professional wrestlers from Ohio
Sportspeople from Cleveland
St. Edward High School (Lakewood, Ohio) alumni
World Heavyweight Champions (WWE)
WWF/WWE Intercontinental Champions
21st-century professional wrestlers
FCW Florida Tag Team Champions